Howard Roddy Clark (born February 13, 1974) is an American professional baseball coach and former utility player. He played in Major League Baseball (MLB) for the Baltimore Orioles, Toronto Blue Jays, and Minnesota Twins, and coached for the Orioles and Chicago White Sox. He is currently the hitting coach for the Memphis Redbirds.

Playing career
Clark was selected by the Baltimore Orioles in the 27th round (744th overall) of the 1992 Major League Baseball Draft. He would spend ten years in Baltimore's minor league system before making an appearance in the majors. After his contract was purchased by the Orioles on July 16, 2002, he finally made his major-league debut as a designated hitter batting leadoff that same day in a 6–1 victory over the Seattle Mariners at Camden Yards. He was given a standing ovation after his first at bat resulted in a double off Joel Piñeiro. Clark eventually scored the first run of the contest. He became a free agent after the 2002 season and signed with the Toronto Blue Jays.

After two seasons with the Blue Jays, Clark signed a minor league contract with the Pittsburgh Pirates. He spent the  season with the Pirates' Double-A and Triple-A affiliates before signing with Baltimore before the  season. Clark played most of the year with their Triple-A affiliate, the Ottawa Lynx, but was called up to Baltimore for a brief stretch during the months of June and July. After 2006, Clark re-signed with Toronto.

On May 30, while playing third base for the Blue Jays, Clark let an easy pop fly fall after Alex Rodriguez yelled in order to distract the infielders. Sports telecasts aired this play numerous times in the following days as part of discussions on Rodriguez's sportsmanship.

Clark was cited in the 2007 Mitchell Report on performance-enhancing drugs in baseball, but was later acquitted when it was discovered his GH was bunk because he bought it from a false Mexican source.

Clark was released by the Blue Jays on August 7, 2007. He then signed a minor league contract with the Minnesota Twins on November 27 of that year and began the  season with the Rochester Red Wings, now the Triple-A affiliate of the Twins. Clark was called up to Minnesota on May 16 to replace the injured Matt Tolbert but was designated for assignment to Rochester on May 31. He accepted the assignment, stating that one of his reasons for returning to Rochester was his good relationship with the fans. He became a free agent at the end of the season and signed a minor league contract with the Toronto Blue Jays in January .

Coaching career
In February 2015, Clark was named the hitting coach of the Delmarva Shorebirds, the Class-A affiliate of the Baltimore Orioles.  In February 2017, Clark was named the assistant hitting coach for the Orioles. He was not retained by the ballclub following the 2019 season. He was named hitting coach of the Charlotte Knights, Triple-A affiliate of the Chicago White Sox, for the 2020 season.  On December 1, 2020, Clark was named assistant hitting coach for the Chicago White Sox.

See also
 List of Major League Baseball players named in the Mitchell Report

References

External links

The Baseball Gauge
Mexican League
Venezuela Winter League

1974 births
Living people
Albany Polecats players
Altoona Curve players
American expatriate baseball players in Canada
American expatriate baseball players in Mexico
Baltimore Orioles coaches
Baltimore Orioles players
Baseball coaches from California
Baseball players from San Diego
Bluefield Orioles players
Bowie Baysox players
Chicago White Sox coaches
Chico Heat players
Frederick Keys players
Gulf Coast Orioles players
Gulf Coast Pirates players
High Desert Mavericks players
Las Vegas 51s players
Leones de Yucatán players
Leones del Caracas players
American expatriate baseball players in Venezuela
Major League Baseball hitting coaches
Major League Baseball infielders
Major League Baseball left fielders
Major League Baseball right fielders
Mexican League baseball center fielders
Mexican League baseball first basemen
Mexican League baseball right fielders
Mexican League baseball second basemen
Minnesota Twins players
Minor league baseball coaches
New Hampshire Fisher Cats players
Ottawa Lynx players
Pastora de los Llanos players
Rochester Red Wings players
Syracuse Chiefs players
Syracuse SkyChiefs players
Toronto Blue Jays players